Pietreni may refer to several villages in Romania:

 Pietreni, a village in Deleni Commune, Constanța County
 Pietreni, a village in Costești Commune, Vâlcea County

See also 
 Piatra (disambiguation)
 Pietriș (disambiguation)
 Pietrari (disambiguation)
 Pietrosu (disambiguation)
 Pietrișu (disambiguation)
 Pietroasa (disambiguation)
 Pietroșani (disambiguation)
 Pietricica (disambiguation)